Springfield Transit Services is the operator of public transportation in Greene County, Missouri. Fourteen routes operate throughout metropolitan Springfield, with 13 functioning Monday-Saturday (except for the weekdays only Route 15). On Sunday and during late nights, 4 bus routes navigate quadrants of the cities and provide more limited and specialized service. All current buses also feature bike racks.  Paratransit is provided by the city under the name Access Express.

Route list
1 North Kansas Expressway
2 East Dale
4 East Central
5 South Glenstone
6 College
7 South Campbell
8 Norton
9 South Fort
10 Cedarbrook
11 Sunshine
12 South National
13 Nichols/Broadway
14 West Atlantic
15 East Kearney

External links
 City Utilities

Bus transportation in Missouri
Transportation in Springfield, Missouri